Captain Calamity may refer to:

Captain Calamity (film), a 1936 motion picture starring George F. Houston
 Captain Calamity, a DC Comics villain
Stuart Hill (sailor) (born 1943), nicknamed "Captain Calamity"